is a Japanese manga series written and illustrated by Natsume Ono. It was serialized in Shogakukan's  manga magazine Monthly Ikki from November 2005 to July 2010, with its chapters published in eight  volumes under the Ikki Comix imprint. It is licensed for distribution in North America by Viz Media.

The manga was adapted into a twelve-episode anime television series, produced by Manglobe, and written and directed by Tomomi Mochizuki, which aired on Fuji TV's Noitamina programming block from April to July 2010. Funimation streamed it online as part of an international deal with Fuji TV allowing them to simulcast series from the Noitamina block. NIS America licensed the series for a home video release in North America in 2012. The license expired with no plans for renewal in 2017. In 2022, RetroCrush began streaming the anime online with English subtitles.

House of Five Leaves also inspired a spin-off manga, serialized on the Web Ikipara Comic page of Shogakukan's Ikki Paradise website from January 2013 to June 2014. Its chapters were later published in a single  volume under the Ikki Comix imprint.

Plot
One day, he encounters Yaichi, the charismatic leader of a group of bandits calling themselves the Five Leaves, and is offered a job as his bodyguard. Although he is worried about their intentions, Masanosuke is intrigued by the group and agrees to work with them.

Characters

Masanosuke is a skilled samurai hailing from a prominent family. His father is deceased and his mother continues to live at their estate. He succeeded his father as head of household as he is the eldest son of his family, with a younger brother and sister. Although he was a loyal and highly skilled subject of his , he is a very timid person and becomes highly anxious around crowds, especially when they are observing him. Ultimately, his personality caused his  to release him from his service. Masanosuke also resigned from his position as head of his household on the advice of his uncle when his  expressed his desire to let him go. Feeling unwelcome in his hometown, he left and settled in Edo, the capital of Japan before its renaming. There, he sought work as a bodyguard, though there was little demand for such work, and due to his pride as a samurai he often refused work that he believed was below his station. He was eventually hired by Yaichi as a bodyguard of the Five Leaves to protect them during their exchanges of ransom money. Initially unaware of their illegal activities, once he became aware of them he was unsure if he should continue in their employment. He eventually decided to continue working for them as he was in need of money, both to live on and to send home. He is also curious about Yaichi and his past. Although he sometimes idolizes Yaichi's carefree behavior and philosophy, he is also aware that Yaichi harbors a dark past. Despite eventually learning of what Yaichi has done, Masanosuke still desires to stay by his side.

Aside from being timid, Masanosuke is also naive in nature. He is always earnest in his actions and is both poor at deceiving others and unsuspecting of deception in others. He has a habit of speaking his mind, oftentimes without thought or reading the atmosphere, which sometimes causes others to lecture him.

As the series progresses he is shown to become more mature and comfortable with himself. By the end of the series, he is able to set aside his pride to keep what he holds dear and is confident in his purpose.

The leader of the Five Leaves. A mysterious person, he dislikes talking about his own past and lives in a local brothel, protecting and flirting with the women working in there. Distinguishable by his light-colored hair and his tanned skin, he is often seen smoking a pipe. At the beginning of the series, he is calm and carefree, seemingly living life to the fullest and intent on living in only the present, something he expressed to Masanosuke. He initially hired Masanosuke to scare off other bodyguards during a ransom transaction, but let him join the Five Leaves because he found Masanosuke "interesting". Later on, he states that he finds the samurai "annoying", and begins to avoid Masanosuke. Due to his mysterious but carefree personality, Masanosuke has become interested in learning about his past, something which discomforts him. After his former gang comes after him, Yaichi attempts to disband the Five Leaves and becomes reclusive.

As a result, he became quiet and withdrawn, with his only friends being a family servant named Yaichi and the heir of a neighboring family named Yagi. He was kidnapped by a bandit named Jin on the direction of his foster mother, who had recently given birth to a son. The bandits were to kill him, but Jin instead told Seinoshin what was going on and let him decide whether to return to the estate and face death or to simply run away. Seinoshin initially refused to believe any of it and was certain that his servant Yaichi would protect him. Jin lied and told him that the servant facilitated the kidnapping on orders from the mother, which traumatized Seinoshin. He eventually decided not to return to the estate and instead joined the bandits under the moniker of "Sei the Drifter". Before the events of the story, he sold out the other bandits in an unexplained event, which later lead them to come after him.

In the anime, he is said to have become a merciless killer who, for reasons unknown, betrayed his old gang by selling them out. He then fled to Edo where he became known as "Ichi", forming the Five Leaves gang with a woman named Otake whom he paid out of bondage from a brothel. When his past catches up to him, he stumbles into a graveyard and mourns at his servant's tombstone until daylight, when Masanosuke arrives and comforts him.

Once a lone thief, he is now a member of Five Leaves as a spy, gathering information about their targets. He creates metal hair ornaments for women as a business to generate money outside of the Five Leaves gang. Calm and collected, Matsukichi usually does his job, but once he has a goal he doesn't stop until he achieves it, making others think he is reckless. He reveals to Masanosuke that he works for the Five Leaves because he is indebted to Yaichi, who saved him from a group of pursuers who caught him trying to steal money. At one point, he stole money in order to support his wife and son, whom he never knew he had, when the son was injured. During a break-in, he was injured and discovered by the master of the estate, who offered to listen to his reason for stealing.

Owner of a tavern where the members of Five Leaves meet and discuss their plans. Umezō was a former criminal and member of a notorious gang of robbers, but he wanted to leave. Fortunately, the gang leader was kind enough to let him go, but it was mostly because his skills were not needed and his departure wouldn't affect the success of their activities. Afterward, Umezō got married and had a daughter named Okinu through his wife, who later died from an illness. He is quite overprotective of Okinu, holding grudges against anyone who makes her cry, and his gruff manner seems unfriendly to those who first meet him. At first, he is not accepting of Masanosuke because of his timidity and "soft heart", but he gradually warms up to him. Umezō initially joined the Five Leaves to get revenge on a man who had been harassing Okinu, but continued in order to help another man pay bribe money.

Otake is the local geisha of the Five Leaves. She is revealed as having worked in a brothel until Yaichi paid her way out of bondage. Out of gratitude, she then began working together with Yaichi and formed the Five Leaves, which she also named. Cool-headed and sultry, she is among the first of the Five Leaves gang to accept Masanosuke upon his arrival. She later moves into Masanosuke's old apartment – accompanied by a cat that used to visit Masanosuke frequently – because she wanted a place of her own to live in.

Media

Manga
Written and illustrated by Natsume Ono, House of Five Leaves was serialized in Shogakukan's  manga magazine Monthly Ikki from November 25, 2005, to July 24, 2010. The individual chapters were collected and published in eight  volumes under Shogakukan's Ikki Comix imprint from July 28, 2006, to September 30, 2010.

The manga is licensed for distribution in North America by Viz Media. It was first released in a digital, English-language version of Ikki magazine, and later published in eight print volumes under the Viz Signature (or SigIkki) imprint from September 21, 2010, to September 18, 2012. The series is also licensed in Taiwan by Taiwan Tohan Co. and in France by Kana.

List of volumes

Spin-off
A spin-off manga, was serialized on the Web Ikipara Comic page of Shogakukan's Ikki Paradise website from January 4, 2013, to June 6, 2014. A single  volume was published under Shogakukan's Ikki Comix imprint on March 6, 2015. The manga depicts the childhood of Tachibana, a supporting character in House of Five Leaves.

Anime
The anime adaptation of House of Five Leaves was produced by Manglobe and written and directed by Tomomi Mochizuki. The show's musical soundtrack was composed by Kayo Konishi and Yukio Kondō, while the opening theme song "Sign of Love" was performed by immi, and the ending theme song "All I Need Is..." was performed by Rake. The series aired on Fuji TV's Noitamina programming block in Japan from April 15 to July 1, 2010, for a total of twelve episodes. On April 16, 2010, Noitamina producer Kōji Yamamoto apologized to the anime's staff via his Twitter account for the first episode's low television rating of 1.5% – a third of what many series in the Noitamina block earn. The anime was distributed on six DVD sets in Japan by Media Factory, with the first DVD set released on July 23, 2010, and the last DVD set released on December 22, 2010.

House of Five Leaves was licensed for streaming in North America by Funimation as a part of a deal with Fuji TV allowing them to simulcast series from the Noitamina block. The episodes premiered on Funimation's website one hour after the initial Japanese broadcast. They were later uploaded to Hulu and YouTube. NIS America licensed the series for a home video release in North America, with a premium DVD set released on March 6, 2012, and a standard DVD set released on March 12, 2013. The license expired with no plans for renewal in 2017. The anime was also licensed for a home video release in the United Kingdom by Beez Entertainment and in Australia and New Zealand by Siren Visual. In 2022, Digital Media Rights' RetroCrush service began streaming the anime online with English subtitles.

List of episodes

Reception
The American Library Association's YALSA division included House of Five Leaves on its list of Great Graphic Novels for Teens in 2011.

References

Further reading

External links
  
 House of Five Leaves at Viz Media
 

2006 manga
2010 anime television series debuts
Anime series based on manga
Drama anime and manga
Manglobe
Martial arts anime and manga
Noitamina
Seinen manga
Shogakukan manga
Viz Media manga